Mathiesen Eidsvold Værk ANS (MEV) is a Norwegian industrial company, owned by the Mathiesen industrial family, and historically one of the largest timber companies of Norway, and arguably Europe.

The company's roots date back to 1671. From 1842 to 1892, the company was known as Tostrup & Mathiesen and owned by the Mathiesen and Tostrup families. The heir to the Tostrup family's shares sold it to the Mathiesen family, and it was renamed Mathiesen Eidsvold Værk in 1892. In the 1840s, the company established its headquarters in Paris, although it was since relocated to Norway.

In 1994, Mathiesen Eidsvold Værk's timber branch was sold and continued under the name Moelven Industrier. The company is currently owned by Haaken Eric Mathiesen.

See also
Mathiesen family

References

External links
Mathiesen Eidsvold Værk
Eidsvoll museum

Forest products companies
Companies based in Oslo
Companies based in Paris
Companies based in Akershus
Norwegian landowners
Companies established in 1671
1671 establishments in Norway